Kiwi Travel International Airlines was a New Zealand based airline which pioneered discount flights between secondary airports in Australia and New Zealand in the mid-1990s. The airline was established by Ewan Wilson and several associates. Wilson served as CEO and was later convicted on four counts of fraud. It was reported in March 2015 that he was looking at restarting an airline, under the name Kiwi Regional Airlines.

Charter services
The airline began as Kiwi Travel Air Charters in July 1994, operating weekly charters between Hamilton, New Zealand and Brisbane, Australia, using a leased Air Nauru Boeing 737-400. In December 1994, charters were operated to Brisbane, Tonga and Western Samoa. The network was expanded in April 1995 to include Queensland coastal cities, including the Gold Coast, Cairns, Townsville and Rockhampton. The last charter flight was operated on 27 August 1995, following the commencement of scheduled services.

Scheduled flights
Following the issue of the necessary government permits, Kiwi Travel International Airlines commenced scheduled flights between Hamilton and Sydney using a leased Boeing 727-200 on 23 August 1995. The 727 aircraft was operated on behalf of Kiwi by AvAtlantic of the United States, who also held the air operator's certificate on behalf of the airline. Flights were operated from the New Zealand cities of Hamilton and Dunedin. Due to the short runways at these airports the aircraft could only take on limited fuel due to weight restrictions and needed to land in Auckland and Christchurch respectively to take on more fuel before making the trans-Tasman crossing. The airline offered full economy services as well as no frills "Peanuts and Cola"-class fares.

Competition, route expansion and fleet changes
By the end of 1995, Air New Zealand had established Freedom Air via its subsidiary Mount Cook Airline and operated in direct competition with Kiwi, offering the same routes and a similar fare structure. In early 1996, Kiwi replaced its Boeing 727 with a leased Boeing 757 from the UK-based company Air 2000, later replaced by a Boeing 737. Freedom Air also operated a Boeing 737. Kiwi added a second aircraft, an Airbus A320, and expanded its network to include Christchurch and the Australian city of Melbourne. By September 1996, trans-Tasman fares reached historic lows of $199 for return tickets between Melbourne/Christchurch and Melbourne/Hamilton.

Both Kiwi and Freedom operated with ad hoc liveries based on those of their lessors; Kiwi used a stylised Kiwi bird, while Freedom Air used a stylised sun.

Financial troubles and liquidation
Following intense competition with Freedom Air and a series of financial difficulties, Kiwi Travel International Airlines went into voluntary liquidation on 9 September 1996. Passengers on both sides of the Tasman Sea were stranded. In Brisbane, the company's Boeing 737 and Airbus A320 were taken by Airservices Australia in lieu of unpaid aviation fees. They were eventually returned to their owners.

Freedom Air ceased operations in March 2008, with its routes being taken over by its parent company, Air New Zealand. Air New Zealand stopped all international flights out of Hamilton and Palmerston North as of mid-April 2009. Flights from Dunedin have been reduced to a seasonal basis.

See also
 List of defunct airlines of New Zealand
 History of aviation in New Zealand

Further reading
Wilson, Ewan: Dogfight: the inside story of the Kiwi Airlines collapse. Auckland: Howling at the Moon, 1996. .

References 

Defunct airlines of New Zealand
Defunct low-cost airlines
Airlines established in 1994
Airlines disestablished in 1996
1996 disestablishments in New Zealand
New Zealand companies established in 1994